Aivar is an Estonian masculine given name.

People named Aivar include:
Aivar Anniste (born 1980), football player
Aivar Kokk (born 1960), politician
 (born 1965), archeologist
Aivar Kuusmaa (born 1967), basketball player and coach
Aivar Lillevere (born 1963), football coach
Aivar Mäe (born 1960), choir conductor and theatre director
Aivar Ojastu (born 1961),  track and field athlete
Aivar Õun (born 1959), politician
Aivar Pilv (born 1961), lawyer
Aivar Pohlak (born 1963), football manager
Aivar Põldvee (born 1962), historian (:et)
Aivar Priidel (born 1977), football player
Aivar Rehe (1963–2019), banker and civil servant
Aivar Rehemaa (born 1982), cross-country skier
Aivar Riisalu (born 1961), singer, politician and businessman
 (Seaküla Simson; born 1959), sculptor
Aivar Sõerd (born 1964), politician
Aivar Surva (born 1962), politician

See also
 Aivar (film), a 2011 Indian film

Estonian masculine given names